Nene Monaganni ( I Am the Hero) is a 1968 Telugu-language action crime film, produced and directed by S. D. Lal on Prathima Films banner. It stars N. T. Rama Rao, Sheela  and the music is composed by T. V. Raju.

Plot
Bhadrayya (Rajanala) is a notorious, ruthless, dangerous dacoit who makes terrible extorsions. DSP Nandana Rao (Satyanarayana) is appointed by the Govt to catch him. Nandana Rao leads a happy family life with his dedicated wife, Yashoda (Santha Kumari), and his brother-in-law Inspector Mutyala Rao (Dhulipala). Bhadrayya has a son Nani whom he loves a lot. Once in a Police encounter, Nani gets a shot when Bhadrayya thinks that his son is dead. On the other side, Nandana Rao is also seriously injured, and he dies at the hospital where Yashoda spots Nani and learns him as Bhadrayya's son. Now she wants to keep the child along with her so that Bhadrayya will arrive for him when she can take her revenge. Even her brother Mutyala Rao opposes it, and she does so. As days pass, Yashoda develops love & affection towards the child, she renames him as Vamsidhar and treats him as her own. Years roll by, Vamsi (N. T. Rama Rao) becomes a CBI Officer in the nurture of Yashoda without knowing his original identity. He falls in love with Neela (Sheela), daughter of Mutyala Rao, who is a commissioner at present. Though Yashoda agrees for their alliance, Mutyala Rao objects to it because of his bad impression towards Vamsi that he is an heir of the monster. Parallelly, Bhadrayya grows into a deadly gangster who is fanatic to conquer the entire country for which he creates a lot of destructions. Vamsi is appointed as a special officer to give an end to these atrocities. In between, Vamsi finds out the truth even then he stands for piety. At last, Vamsi eliminates Bhadrayya & his gang. Before dying, Bhadrayya requests Vamsi to call him as a father, and he does so. Here Mutyala Rao also realizes Vamsi's virtue. Finally, the movie ends on a happy note with the marriage of Vamsi & Neela.

Cast
N. T. Rama Rao as Vamsidhar
Sheela as Neela
Rajanala as Bhadrayya 
Dhulipala as Police Commissioner Mutyala Rao 
Ramana Reddy as Devaiah 
M. Balayya as Foreign Agent
Satyanarayana as DSP Nandana Rao 
Allu Ramalingaiah as Editor Appala Chary
Raja Babu as Reporter Varahalu / K.V.Hall 
Santha Kumari as Yashoda 
Geetanjali as 0
Sandhya Rani as Reporter 
Jyothi Lakshmi as 00

Soundtrack

References

External links
 

Indian crime action films
Indian action thriller films
Films scored by T. V. Raju
1960s Telugu-language films
1960s crime action films
1960s action thriller films
Films directed by S. D. Lal